Hunza, also known as Kanjut, was a principality and then later a princely state in a subsidiary alliance with British India from 1892 to August 1947, for three months was unaligned, and then from November 1947 until 1974 was a princely state of Pakistan. Hunza covered territory now forming the northernmost part of Gilgit-Baltistan, Pakistan.

The princely state bordered the Gilgit Agency to the south, the former princely state of Nagar to the east, Xinjiang, China to the northeast and Afghanistan to the northwest. The state capital was Baltit (also known as Karimabad). The princely state of Hunza is now Hunza District in Pakistan.

History 

Hunza was an independent principality for centuries. It was ruled by the Mirs of Hunza, who took the title of Thum.

The Hunzai's were tributaries and allies to China, acknowledging China as suzerain since 1760 or 1761. Hunza rulers claimed descent from Alexander the Great, and viewed themselves and the Emperor of China as the most important leaders in the world. When the Kanjutis (people of Hunza) raided the mountainous places of Karakorum and the Kunlun Mountains, including Xaidulla, where some groups of the nomadic Kirghiz were the main inhabitants, they sold Kirghiz as slaves to the Chinese.

From 1847 on, the Mir of Hunza gave nominal allegiance to China. Mir Ghazanfur Khan helped China in the fight against the Uyghur separatist Afaqi Khoja revolts in Yarkand, after which China granted Hunza a jagir (land grant) in Yarkand and paid him a subsidy. In 1860, the Mir paid tribute to the Dogras after their conquest of Gilgit, and Hunza became a tributary to both Kashmir and China. The last fully independent ruler, Mir Safdar Khan, who ruled from 1886, escaped to China after an invasion by the British.

In the late 19th century Hunza became embroiled in the Great Game, the rivalry between Britain and Russia for control of the northern approaches to India. The British suspected Russian involvement "with the Rulers of the petty States on the northern boundary of Kashmir"; In 1888 the Russian captain Bronislav Grombchevsky visited Hunza, and the following year the British captain Francis Younghusband visited Hunza to express British displeasure at Kanjuti raids in the Raskam. Younghusband formed a low opinion of the ruler, Safdar Ali, describing him as "a cur at heart and unworthy of ruling so fine a race as the people of Hunza".
In 1891 the British mounted the Hunza-Nagar Campaign and gained control of Hunza and the neighbouring valley of Nagar. The Mir, Safdar Khan, fled to China with his two brothers, Prince Muhammad Nafis Khan and Prince Muhammad Nazim Khan.

Prince Muhammad Nafis Khan was the primary claimant of the Mir-ship of Hunza as the eldest son of Mir Ghazan Khan I. However, the British installed his younger brother Muhammad Nazim Khan as Mir in September 1892. Hunza became a princely state in a subsidiary alliance with British India, a status it retained until 1947. The Kuomintang Republic of China government engaged in secret negotiations with the Mir of Hunza over restoring the state's previous relationship with China, amidst the partitioning of British India, with the Hunza state independent from India and Pakistan. The Kuomintang also plotted to expand its influence into Kashmir, taking advantage of the weakness of the newly independent India. However, due to the war of 1947 in Kashmir, the Mir of Hunza changed his mind and acceded to Pakistan, after a coup against India in Gilgit.

Territorial claims 
Historically the people of Hunza cultivated and grazed areas to the north and the Mir claimed those areas as part of Hunza's territories. Those areas included the Taghdumbash Pamir and the Raskam Valley.

According to Kanjuti traditions, as related by McMahon, the Mir's eighth ancestor, Shah Salim Khan, pursued nomadic Khirghiz thieves to Tashkurghan and defeated them. "To celebrate this victory, Shah Salim Khan erected a stone cairn at Dafdar and sent a trophy of a Khirghiz head to the Chinese with a message that Hunza territory extended as far as Dafdar". The Kanjutis were already in effective possession of the Raskam and no question had been raised about it. The Mir's claims went a good deal beyond a mere right of cultivation. He "asserts that forts were built by the Hunza people without any objection or interference from the Chinese at Dafdar, Qurghan, Ujadhbhai, Azar on the Yarkand River and at three or four other places in Raskam."

McMahon was able roughly to define the territorial limits of Kanjut. "The boundaries of Taghdumbash, Khunjerab, and Raskam, as claimed by the Kanjuts, are the following: the northern watershed of the Taghdumbash Pamir from the Wakhjir Pass through the Baiyik peak to Dafdar, thence across the river to the Zankan nullah; thence through Mazar and over the range to Urok, a point on the Yarkand river between Sibjaida and Itakturuk. Thence it runs along the northern watershed of the Raskam valley to the junction of the Bazar Dara River and the Yarkand River. From thence southwards over the mountains to the Mustagh River leaving the Aghil Dewan or Aghil Pass within Hunza limits."

In 1898 Captain H. P. P. Deasy substantially corroborated McMahon's information. Deasy resigned his commission to devote himself to trans-Himalayan exploration. An item of special interest was Deasy's description of the limits of Raskam. Starting from Aghil Dewan or pass, in the Karakoram range, the dividing line ran north-east to Bazar Dara, where it met the Yarkand River. He found an outpost built of earth at Bazar Dara, surmounted by a Chinese flag (by 1898 the Chinese had intruded to the area south of the Kun Lun Mountains with a few unarmed Kirghiz in occupation. This marked the boundary claimed by China. From there the line ran "along the northern watershed of the Raskam valley to Dafdar in the Taghdumbash Pamir, to the north of the mills at that place, and thence to the Baiyik peak. Deasy also came upon clear evidence of what could only have been Kanjuti occupation. South of Azgar "many ruins of houses, old irrigation channels and fields now no longer tilled, testify to Raskam having formerly been inhabited and cultivated". Anyone familiar with the care with which the Kanjuts cultivate every available strip of land in Hunza would have no hesitation in regarding this as proof of long standing Kanjuti occupation. The remains could not have been attributed to the Kirghiz; they were unfamiliar with the state of art. "Seven locations in the Raskam were involved. Azgar and Ursur on the right bank, and five others on the left, that is on the Mustagh-Karakoram side-Kukbash, Kirajilga, Ophrang, Uroklok, and Oitughrak, extending from Sarakamish, north of Kunjerab pass to Bazar Dara, north of the Arghil pass".

The Chinese completed the reconquest of Xinjiang in 1878. Before they lost southern parts of the province to Yakub Beg in 1863, their practical authority, as Ney Elias and Younghusband consistently maintained, had never extended south of their outposts at Sanju and Kilian along the northern foothills of the Kun Lun range. Nor did they establish a known presence to the south of the line of outposts in the twelve years immediately following their return. Ney Elias, who had been Joint Commissioner in Ladakh for several years, noted on 21 September 1889 that he had met the Chinese in 1879 and 1880 when he visited Kashgar. "They told me that they considered their line of 'chatze', or posts, as their frontier – viz., Kugiar, Kilian, Sanju, Kiria, etc.- and that they had no concern with what lay beyond the mountains" i.e. the Kun Lun range in northern Kashmir.

In March 1899 the British proposed, in a Note from Sir Claude MacDonald to China, a new boundary between China and British India. The Note proposed that China should relinquish its claims to suzerainty over Hunza, and in return Hunza should relinquish its claims to most of the Taghdumbash and Raskam districts. The Chinese did not respond to the note.

Until 1937 the inhabitants of the Taghdumbash Pamir paid tribute to the Mir of Hunza, who exercised control over the pastures,

Relationship with Jammu and Kashmir 
Although never ruled directly by neighbouring Jammu and Kashmir, Hunza was a vassal of Jammu and Kashmir from the time of Maharaja Ranbir Singh of Jammu and Kashmir in 1860. The Mirs of Hunza sent an annual tribute to China and the Mirs of Nagar to Maharaja Kashmir. Durbar until 1947, and along with the ruler of Nagar were considered to be among the most loyal vassals of the Maharaja of Jammu and Kashmir. According to Emma Nicholson, "All the evidence points to the fact that Gilgit and Baltistan region were constituent parts of Jammu and Kashmir by 1877". They were under the sovereignty of the Maharaja of Jammu and Kashmir and remained in this princely domain until the date of accession "in its entirety to the new Dominion of India" on 26 October 1947.
Further, this fact is confirmed and reiterated from the correspondence of the Maharaja of Jammu and Kashmir dated 26 October 1947 with Lord Mountbatten, Governor General of India which states that the state of Jammu and Kashmir has a common boundary with the "Soviet Republic", and the said statement also determines the fact that inter alia Gilgit and Kanjut (which includes the Raskam, Hunza valley and Taghdumbash) are integral parts of Jammu and Kashmir. Pandit Jawaharlal Nehru had also made a similar statement that "Jammu and Kashmir's Northern frontiers, as you are aware, run in common with those of three countries, Afghanistan, the Union of Soviet Socialist Republics and China". These statements of the Maharaja of Jammu and Kashmir as well as Pandit Jawaharlal Nehru also have a bearing on the territorial extent of Kanjut as well as the rest of the princely state of Jammu and Kashmir at the time of her accession "in its entirety to the new Dominion of India" on 26 October and Section (4) of the Constitution of Jammu and Kashmir which pertains to the territorial extent of the Indian state of Jammu and Kashmir also unequivocally states that "The territory of the State shall comprise all the territories which on the fifteenth day of August, 1947, were under the sovereignty or suzerainty of the Ruler of the State".

Accession to Pakistan
On 3 November 1947, the ruler, Mohammad Jamal Khan sent a telegram to Mohammad Ali Jinnah acceding his state to Pakistan. It stated:

"I declare with pleasure on behalf of myself and my State accession to Pakistan."

Government 

The hereditary rulers, the  "Mirs" were assisted by a council of Wazirs or ministers. Details of early rulers are uncertain, with the first definite dates from 1750 onwards.

Geography 

The Hunza valley is situated at an elevation of 2,438 metres (7,999 feet). The former capital Baltit has an elevation of 2477 metres (8129 feet). Both Baltit and an earlier fort, Altit Fort, have been extensively restored and are major tourist attractions in the region.

For many centuries, Hunza has provided the quickest access to Swat and Gandhara for a person travelling on foot. The route was impassable to baggage animals; only human porters could get through, and then only with permission from the locals.

Hunza was easily defended as the paths were often less than half a metre (about 18") wide. The high mountain paths often crossed bare cliff faces on logs wedged into cracks in the cliff, with stones balanced on top. They were also constantly exposed to regular damage from weather and falling rocks. These were the much feared "hanging passageways" of the early Chinese histories that terrified all, including several famous Chinese Buddhist monks.

Demographics
Most of the people of Hunza are Ismaili Muslims. The official language of the state was Persian until 1947, when it was replaced by Urdu. The common language of Hunza is Burushaski, while Wakhi and Shina languages are spoken in Upper Hunza and Lower Hunza respectively. Urdu and is also widely understood in Hunza.

See also 
 Hunza Valley
 Hunza District
 Northern Areas
 Karakoram Highway
 Karakoram Mountains
 Nagar

References

Bibliography

External links
 Government of Northern Areas
 Government of Pakistan

Hindu Kush
History of Gilgit Agency
Sites along the Silk Road
Hunza
Princely states of India
Princely states of Pakistan
Muslim princely states of India
13th-century establishments in India
1200s establishments in Asia
1974 disestablishments in Pakistan